The Chandalash is a river in the Pskem Mountains of Chatkal District in Jalal-Abad Region in western Kyrgyzstan. The river is formed at the south west slope of Talas Alatau and flows into the Chatkal.

References

Rivers of Kyrgyzstan
Jalal-Abad Region